Noémie Abgrall (born 1 December 1999) is a French professional racing cyclist, who currently rides for UCI Women's Continental Team .

References

External links

1999 births
Living people
French female cyclists
Place of birth missing (living people)
21st-century French women